The Bureau of Naval Personnel (BUPERS) in the United States Department of the Navy is similar to the human resources department of a corporation. The bureau provides administrative leadership and policy planning for the Office of the Chief of Naval Operations (OPNAV) and the U.S. Navy at large. BUPERS is led by the Chief of Naval Personnel.

As of 2009, the office of the Bureau of Naval Personnel served as a parent command to the Navy Personnel Command (NPC). The duties of NPC are nearly identical to the former office of BUPERS and the command's logo even incorporates the name of the latter's office. BUPERS is also the overseeing authority for Navy Recruiting Command.  Most of the BUPERS offices are located in Millington, Tennessee, and Arlington, Virginia.

History
Naval personnel matters were originally handled by the Secretary of War until the establishment of the Navy Department on April 30, 1798. It was not until 1815 that the Secretary of the Navy took control of personnel matters. In 1861, the Office of Detail was created and functions related to the detailing of officers and the appointment and instruction of volunteer officers, as well as the purchase of ships and related matters were transferred.  The Bureau of Equipment and Recruiting was concurrently established to handle enlisted recruiting and service record maintenance. 

The Bureau of Navigation was established in 1862 and three years later the Office of Detail was placed under it. In 1889, the Bureau of Equipment and Recruiting transferred its enlisted personnel activities to the Bureau of Navigation as well. On May 13, 1942, the command's name changed to the Bureau of Naval Personnel, and in 1982 it changed to Naval Military Personnel Command. In 1991, the name changed back to the Bureau of Naval Personnel or "BUPERS" for short. NAVPERS stands for Navy Personnel, an acronym often used on official manuals and forms from the Navy Personnel Command.

Navy Personnel Research, Studies, and Technology
NPRST was a division of the Bureau of Naval Personnel. Since 1946, NPRST or its predecessors have served as a personnel policy laboratory for the Navy. The mission of NPRST was to "To improve Sailor, team, and unit readiness by responsibly delivering innovative science and technology that improves the efficiency and effectiveness of Navy human resource functions and processes."

NPRST can be traced back to 1946, when its predecessor was located in the Washington Navy Yard as Personnel Research Detachment. In 1962, it was formally established as Personnel Research Laboratory.  In 1973, SECNAV established the Navy Personnel Research & Development Center (NPRDC) in San Diego, CA “as a centralized organization for managing, coordinating, and conducting R&D in the areas of Manpower, Personnel, Training, and Human Factors Engineering."  In the late 1980s, the human factors function was transferred to another R&D lab.  

NPRST research has historically covered 11 broad areas covering the entire spectrum of human resources. The Navy Pregnancy and Parenthood Survey collects information about parenthood, family planning, and birth control from both men and women, and gathers additional information about pregnancy from women. This data is not readily available in current Navy databases. It has been administered about every two years since 1988, and was most recently administered in 2010.

As of October 2012, NPRST employed 58 government workers, service men and women, and contractors on site in Millington, Tennessee to complete the mission, with additional contractors located elsewhere for individual projects. NPRST was a fee-for-service entity, meaning that they are not directly funded by Department of Defense budgets; funding for projects is redirected from the sponsor of the project, usually through the use of a Military Interdepartmental Purchase Request (MIPR). 

In 1995, the Base Realignment and Closure Commission (BRAC-IV) recommended that NPRDC be disestablished and realigned; the training mission was realigned to NAWCTSD while the manpower and personnel research mission was realigned to Navy Personnel Command.  In 1999, NPRST was formally established as a department of NPC.  In 2005, the function was realigned from NPC to BUPERS Echelon 2. NPRST has since been closed down by the Navy.

Chiefs of the Bureau

References

External links
Official site

1861 establishments in the United States
Naval Personnel